is a Japanese voice actress employed by the talent management firm Arts Vision.

Anime

TV
Pāman (1983) (Michiko Sawada, Girl)

Unknown date
Aishite Knight (Kaoru)
Chibi Maruko-chan (Yumiko, Kazuko Sasayama, Toshiko Tsuchihashi (First), Girl)
City Hunter 2 (Naomi Okabe)
Crayon Shin-chan (Yumi Kusaka)
Fushigi na Koala Blinky (Printy)
Galactic Whirlwind Sasuraiger (Susie Chō)
Goldfish Warning! (Tamiko Umino)
High School Mystery: Gakuen Nanafushigi (Emi Ishida)
Jeanie with the Light Brown Hair (Cathy)
Kerokero Keroppi (Kerorine)
Little Memole (Cynthia)
Manga Mito Kōmon (Onatsu)
Ochamegami Monogatari Korokoro Poron (Poron)
Psycho Armor Govarian (Achika Risa, Puke)
RPG Densetsu Hepoi (Popoko)
Super Bikkuriman (Mānya)
The Kabocha Wine (Chiho)
Tongari Bōshi no Memole (Cynthia)
Yawara! (Kaori Yamada)
Yattodetaman (Koyomi Himekuri)

Movies
Pāman series (xxxx-xx) (Michiko Sawada)
Crayon Shin-chan: Serious Battle! Robot Dad Strikes Back (2014) (Yumi Kusaka)

External links
 Japan Movie Database
 

1959 births
Japanese voice actresses
Living people
Voice actresses from Ōita Prefecture
21st-century Japanese actresses
Arts Vision voice actors
People from Usuki, Ōita